Julio César Benítez Amodeo (October 1, 1940 – April 6, 1968) was an Uruguayan footballer, known for his time in FC Barcelona from 1961 until his surprising death in 1968.

Benítez was a defender, appreciated for his physical strength, technique with the ball and powerful shot. His rivalry with Francisco Gento, Real Madrid player, helped him earn Barcelona's fans appreciation.

Benítez started his football career at the age of 16, in Racing Club de Montevideo, then playing in the Uruguayan first division. In 1959 he played for Real Valladolid, and a year later he moved to Real Zaragoza. In his time with these teams he established himself as a great player. Benítez moved to FC Barcelona in August 1961. In Barcelona he played in several positions in midfield and even in attack, but he became fixated as a fullback after a short while. With Barcelona he won Copa del Generalísimo in 1963 and Inter Cities Fairs Cup in 1966.

He died on April 6, 1968 in Barcelona, three days before a critical game in the Camp Nou against Real Madrid. The cause of his death was eating spoiled seafood, which resulted in gastroenteritis and ultimately his death. His death attracted huge attention to Spanish football in general and Barcelona in particular. 150,000 fans of FC Barcelona were present at his funeral in the Camp Nou, two days before the game. Benítez was buried in a cemetery near Camp Nou on April 8. The Royal Spanish Football Federation decided not to cancel the game, but just put if off by two days. Benítez's last words were "Come on friends, let's win Madrid 2-0!". However, his teammate could not cope psychologically with his death and devote him a win in the game, and the game ended in a 1–1 draw. Nevertheless, on July 11, 1968 Barcelona beat Real Madrid in the cup final, and the win was dedicated in memory of Benítez. The cup title was included in the list of titles won by Benítez, as a dedication to his contribution to the team.

References

External links
"Forty years since the passing of Benítez", at the official website of FC Barcelona 

1940 births
1968 deaths
Uruguayan footballers
Racing Club de Montevideo players
La Liga players
FC Barcelona players
Real Valladolid players
Real Zaragoza players
Association football fullbacks